Keel Hill is a small ice-free hill, standing at the north side of McGregor Glacier, about  east of Crilly Hill, in the Queen Maud Mountains of Antarctica. It was named by the Texas Tech Shackleton Glacier Expedition (1964–65) for Specialist 5th Class Elbert E. Keel, a member of the U.S. Army Aviation Detachment which supported the expedition.

References

Description:	A small ice-free hill, standing at the N side of McGregor Glacier, about 1.5 mi E of Crilly Hill, in the Queen Maud Mountains. Named by the Texas Tech Shackleton Glacier Expedition (1964–65) for Specialist 5th Class Elbert E. Keel, member of the U.S. Army Aviation Detachment which supported the expedition.

Hills of the Ross Dependency
Dufek Coast